Mantas Samusiovas (born 8 September 1978) is a former Lithuanian footballer.

External links

Profile at Khimki 

1978 births
Living people
Lithuanian footballers
Lithuania international footballers
Lithuanian expatriate footballers
Association football defenders
Skonto FC players
FC Torpedo Moscow players
FC Khimki players
FK Sūduva Marijampolė players
FC Mariupol players
FK Šilas players
Russian Premier League players
Ukrainian Premier League players
Expatriate footballers in Ukraine
Lithuanian expatriate sportspeople in Ukraine
Expatriate footballers in Russia
Sportspeople from Kaunas